The Directorate-General for Maritime Affairs and Fisheries (DG MARE) is a Directorate-General of the European Commission, responsible for the policy area of fisheries, the Law of the Sea and Maritime Affairs of the European Union. The current director-general is Charlina Vitcheva.

Mission 
The mission of DG MARE is “To steer, in close relationship with stakeholders at regional and European level, the development and implementation of the Integrated Maritime Policy and to manage the Common Fisheries Policy with a view to promote the sustainable development of maritime activities as well as the sustainable exploitation of fisheries resources within and beyond Community waters”

Structure
The DG MARE encompasses 6 Directorates, all headquartered in Brussels:
 A: Policy development and coordination
 B: External Policy and Markets 
 C: Atlantic, outermost regions and Arctic 
 D: Mediterranean and Black Sea 
 E: Baltic Sea, Black Sea and landlocked member states
 F: Resources

See also
 European Commissioner for Environment, Oceans and Fisheries
 Common Fisheries Policy
 Agriculture and Fisheries Council (Council of the European Union)
 Directorate-General for Agriculture, Fisheries, Social Affairs and Health
 European Parliament Committee on Fisheries
 European Fisheries Control Agency

External links 
 EC DG Maritime Affairs and Fisheries

References 

Maritime Affairs and Fisheries
European Union fishing regulations